The Westwood Academy (formerly The Westwood School) is an academy school for children aged 11 – 18 in Canley, Coventry, England.  With its sports centre completed in July 2008.

History
In 2008, The Westwood School converted to 'Trust' school status with the Local Authority,
Warwick University, Coventry Sports Foundation and a local ICT company. The school gained The BECTA ICT Mark in recognition of its use of ICT in teaching and learning (the only school in Coventry to have gained this award).

The school was previously known as Alderman Callow School and Community College, built to serve the nearby Canley housing estate; however the estate was never completed to its original anticipated size, meaning the school has always had a significantly smaller intake than other schools in Coventry. It was designated a Specialist Technology College in September 2004. This is an area with considerablesocial deprivation. The student population is predominantly White British, although other ethnic heritages are represented. The number of students who have learning difficulties or disabilities and the proportion who are eligible for free school meals are higher than average.

It converted to being an academy in August 2011.

Academics
Virtually all maintained schools and academies follow the National Curriculum, and are inspected by Ofsted on how well they succeed in delivering a 'broad and balanced curriculum'. Schools endeavour to get all students to achieve the English Baccalaureate(EBACC) qualification- this must include core subjects a modern or ancient foreign language, and either History or Geography. 

The school operates a three-year, Key Stage 3 where all the core National Curriculum subjects are taught. There is a sophisticated system of setting into broad bands, that is driven by their previous exposure to Spanish or French at primary school, and the results in their Key Stage 2 tests. Pupils are set by ability in Mathematics and Science, and 
communication groups in English, Computing, RE, Geography and History. they also do PE, Drama, Technology, Art, Music & Dance, Spanish or French. 

In 10 and 11, that is in Key Stage 4 students study a core of English Language, English Literature, Mathematics, Double Award Science, Non-exam Core PE.They choose least one further EBAC subject: Either History, Geography or Computer Science.

They can choose a further two GCSEs to create a personalised curriculum which matches their skills and abilities.  The subjects currently on offer are:Music, Drama, History, Engineering, BTEC Sport, GCSE PE Food Technology, ICT, Geography, Business, Art, Health & Social Care and Computing.

Most pupils will choose to study a language as an additional GCSE with slightly less curriculum time being allocated to Maths and English.

Sports
Students from the Westwood school benefit from the facilities of adjacent Xcel Leisure Centre which also serves as the head office for Coventry Sports Foundation, now operating as CV Life. These include the astro turf pitches which are used by Westwood school students until 5 p.m., when they are handed over to the public.

Notable former pupils
Tamla Kari, British actress

See also
WMG Academy for Young Engineers, Coventry

References

External links

Academies in Coventry
Secondary schools in Coventry